Hugh le Despenser, 1st Baron le Despenser (c. 1308/9 – 8 February 1349), Lord of Glamorgan, was an English peer. Imprisoned as a consequence of his support for deposed king Edward II, he would return to royal favour under Edward III, being made Baron le Despenser in 1338. His title became extinct at his death without issue.

Origin

Hugh was the eldest son and heir of Hugh Despenser the Younger and grandson of Hugh le Despenser, 1st Earl of Winchester. His father and grandfather were both executed and attainted in 1326, when the young Hugh was 18 years old. His mother, Eleanor de Clare, suo jure 6th Lady of Glamorgan, was daughter of Gilbert de Clare, 6th Earl of Hertford and Joan of Acre, a sister of King Edward II.

Career
In 1326, Hugh was ordered by fugitive king Edward II to seize the properties of Henry, Earl of Lancaster. He also supported the king by a long defense of Caerphilly Castle against the forces of the queen, which he only surrendered in 1327 after being promised his life and bodily integrity. He was imprisoned until 1331, including time at Bristol Castle. He was named as a co-conspirator by Edmund, Earl of Kent, in the latter's 1330 confession. Following Edward III reaching majority and overthrowing his mother's faction, Hugh was freed and the king granted him lands and rents worth 200 marks annually. Hugh made a pilgimage to Santiago de Compostela in 1332.

He succeeded his mother's Glamorgan lordship in 1337, and fought in the Scottish Wars in 1337 and 1338.  He was summoned to Royal Councils in 1338, and in the same year was summoned to Parliament, by modern usage making him Baron le Despenser by a new creation, since the attainder of his father and grandfather were still in force. He fought at Sluys in 1340 and at Brittany and Morlaix in 1342 as a banneret. He accompanied the King Edward to France in 1346, and was in the royal retinue at Crecy, and the following year was summoned by the king to the siege of Calais.

Family and death
Hugh had married by April 1341 to Elizabeth Montagu, daughter of William Montagu, 1st Earl of Salisbury and Catherine Grandison, and widow of Giles, Baron Badlesmere, but they had no children.  Hugh died 8 February 1349 and was buried at Tewkesbury Abbey, Gloucestershire, the Barony le Despenser created for him becoming extinct. He was succeeded in his lands by his nephew, Edward Despenser, who was created Baron le Despenser of a new creation in 1357. Hugh's widow, Elizabeth, would remarry to Sir Guy, Baron Briene, before dying in 1359, also being buried at Tewkesbury Abbey.

Ancestry

Notes

Barons le Despencer
1308 births
1349 deaths
14th-century English nobility
Hugh
Peers created by Edward III
Lords of Glamorgan